Helicopter Eela is a 2018 Indian Hindi-language comedy-drama film directed by Pradeep Sarkar. It features Kajol in the lead role as an aspiring singer and single mother Helicopter parent and is written by Mitesh Shah and Anand Gandhi. It is based on the Gujarati play Beta, Kaagdo, written by Anand Gandhi.

Pre-production of the film began in January 2017, and principal photography commenced from 24 January 2018. It was released on 12 October 2018.

Plot 
Eela, a single mother rejoins her college to complete her education after 22 years. In the flashback, it is shown that she is an upcoming, partially-famous model/singer, who records songs written by her boyfriend Arun. When she is recording for a career-breaking song for a Mukesh Bhatt project, the project gets cancelled indefinitely. So she and her boyfriend decide to get married. After few months it is shown that she gives birth to a boy named Vivan. While seeing their family tree, Eela and Arun realise that many male members of Arun's family died in their late 30s, which drives Arun crazy as he is also in his late 30s. So he finally decides to leave Eela and Vivan to pursue his own dreams as it might be his final years. Afterwards, Arun dies. Eela, now a single mom, is very over protective about Vivan. She keeps meddling in Vivan's life continuously and she finally joins the same college as Vivan to complete her studies. One day suddenly Arun comes back, but he goes out as soon he realizes that Eela and Vivan don't need him. Eela's involvement in Vivan's life becomes so much that Vivan decides to leave his house to give some space to Eela and to find her own identity. Eela joins a college theatre club, and starts singing again. During the annual singing competition she is not allowed to sing because of her age and past singing profession. But Vivaan encourages her to sing on the stage and they together give a remarkable performance. In the credits, it is shown that she has resumed her singing finding herself after many years.

Cast 
 Kajol as Eela Raiturkar, Vivan's mother, Arun's wife
 Riddhi Sen as Vivan Raiturkar, Arun and Eela's son
 Rashi Mal as Nikita
 Tota Roy Chowdhury as Arun Raiturkar, Eela's husband, Vivan’s father
 Neha Dhupia as Padma
 Shataf Figar as Madhavi Bhogat
 Muskaan Bamne as Deepthi
 Zakir Hussain as Principal of college
 Atul Kulkarni as Prime Minister 
 Imran Khan in cameo appearance as himself
 Anu Malik in cameo appearance as himself
 Swarnalekha Gupta as Alisha Chinai
 Ila Arun in cameo appearance as herself
 Baba Sehgal in cameo appearance as himself 
 Mahesh Bhatt in cameo appearance as himself
 Shaan in cameo appearance as himself
 Amitabh Bachchan in cameo appearance
 R J Alok as Chemistry Professor

Marketing and promotion
The first trailer of the movie was released on 5 August 2018 having an initial release date as 7 September 2018. But later, the movie release date was postponed to 12 October 2018.

Soundtrack

The background score and two originals of the film is composed by Daniel B.George and other songs are composed by Amit Trivedi and Raghav Sachar. The lyrics are written by Swanand Kirkire, Asma Nabeel and Shyam Anuragi (noted). The first song "Mumma Ki Parchai" was released on 13 August 2018. The second song "Yaadon Ki Almari" was released on 20 August 2018. The song of the film, "Ruk Ruk Ruk Arre Baba Ruk" from the 1994 film Vijaypath originally sung by Alisha Chinai and composed by Anu Malik has been recreated for this film by Raghav Sachar in the voice of Palomi Ghosh.

Reception

Helicopter Eela received mixed reviews from the audience and critics. Kajol and Riddhi Sen received praises for their performances.

See also
 Helicopter parent

References

External links
 
 

2018 drama films
2010s Hindi-language films
Films shot in Mumbai
Ajay Devgn
Indian films based on plays
Films scored by Raghav Sachar
Films scored by Amit Trivedi
Films set in Mumbai
Films about parenting
Indian drama films
Films about families
Films about women in India
Films directed by Pradeep Sarkar
Hindi-language drama films